Calvin Whiting (born November 30, 1995) is a South African-born American rugby union player who plays at center for the Utah Warriors in Major League Rugby (MLR). He also represents the USA playing for the United States men's national team.

Whiting has also represented the United States playing at age-grade level.

Early life
Whiting was born on November 30, 1995, in Johannesburg, South Africa. Whiting moved to Utah in 2011 and attended Lone Peak High School in Highland, Utah. Whiting began attending Brigham Young University in 2015, where he has studied business management and played for the school's rugby team.

Club career
Whiting signed with Major League Rugby's Utah Warriors in early 2019 for the 2019 Major League Rugby season.

International career

USA High School All-Americans
Whiting was named to the United States national under-19 rugby union team (High School All-Americans) three times and served as a team captain.

USA Eagles
Whiting was first named to the roster for the USA Eagles ahead of the 2017 Americas Rugby Championship.  Whiting made his debut for the Eagles on February 25, 2017, appearing as a substitute, in a 57–9 victory against Chile. Whiting also played for the Eagles on March 4, 2017, appearing as a substitute, in an uncapped match against Argentina XV.

References

1995 births
Living people
American rugby union players
United States international rugby union players
Rugby union centres
Utah Warriors players